Pwint Hpoo (born 13 November 1947) is a Burmese former dental professor at the University of Dental Medicine, Yangon. He was also the president of the Myanmar Dental Association (MDA) from January, 2012 to January, 2016.

Early life and education
Pwint Hpoo was born on 13 November 1947 in Yangon, Myanmar. He graduated from University of Dental Medicine, Yangon in July, 1971. He received M.Sc from Manchester in 1981.

See also
 Myanmar Dental Council
 University of Dental Medicine, Mandalay

References

Burmese dental professors
1947 births
Living people